{{Infobox Election
| election_name = 1976 United States presidential election in Washington (state)
| type = presidential
| ongoing = no
| country = Washington
| previous_election = 1972 United States presidential election in Washington (state)
| previous_year = 1972
| next_election = 1980 United States presidential election in Washington (state)
| next_year = 1980
| election_date = November 2, 1976
| image_size = x200px
| image1 =  Gerald Ford presidential portrait (cropped 2).jpg
| nominee1 = Gerald Ford
| party1 = Republican Party (United States)
| home_state1 = Michigan
| running_mate1 = Bob Dole
| electoral_vote1 = 8
| popular_vote1 = 777,732
| percentage1 = 50.0%
| image2 = Jimmy Carter 1977 cropped.jpg
| nominee2 = Jimmy Carter
| party2 = Democratic Party (United States)
| home_state2 = Georgia
| running_mate2 = Walter Mondale
| electoral_vote2 = 0
| popular_vote2 = 717,323
| percentage2 = 46.1%
|map_image=Washington Presidential Election Results 1976.svg
|map_size=380px
|map_caption=County ResultsFordCarter| title = President
| before_election = Gerald Ford
| before_party = Republican Party (United States)
| after_election = Jimmy Carter
| after_party = Democratic Party (United States)
}}

The 1976 United States presidential election in Washington''' was held on November 2, 1976 as part of the 1976 United States presidential election. State voters chose nine representatives, or electors, to the Electoral College, who voted for president and vice president. 

Incumbent President Gerald Ford won the state of Washington with 50% of the vote, which made the state 6% more Republican than the nation-at-large,  but Ford received only eight of the state's nine electoral votes. Former California Governor Ronald Reagan lost the Republican nomination to Gerald Ford in 1976 and was not on the ballot in any state. However, he was given one electoral vote by Washington faithless elector Mike Padden. 

As of 2020, the 1976 election remains the last time that a Democrat would win the presidency without carrying Washington state, or that the state would vote Republican in a close nationwide contest. 1976 was also the last time that Washington state voted more Republican than the nation as a whole, and the last time until 2016 that a presidential candidate would lose an electoral vote to a faithless elector in the state. The 1976 election was also the last time that Clallam County backed the losing national candidate, and the county now has the nation's longest streak of picking the winner of the electoral college in presidential elections by being the only county in the nation, as of 2020, that has backed the winning national candidate every time since 1980. In addition, Clallam County has only twice gone for the losing national candidate since 1920 (in 1968 and 1976).

Results

Results by county

See also
 United States presidential elections in Washington (state)

Notes

References

1976 Washington (state) elections
Washington
1976